Vladislav Doronin (born 7 November 1962) is a Russian real estate developer and art collector. He is the owner and chairman of Aman Resorts, chairman and CEO of OKO Group and is a co-founder of Moscow-based Capital Group.

Early life and education 
Vladislav Doronin was born on November 7, 1962 in Leningrad, Russian Soviet Federative Socialist Republic (now Saint Petersburg, Russia) in a Russian family of Yuri Grigoryevich Doronin (b. Sep 15, 1937) and Zinaida Mikhailovna Doronina (b. Oct 2, 1935). He graduated from the Moscow Lomonosov State University.

Business career

Marc Rich + Co 
In 1985, he relocated to Geneva and then to Zug, where he worked under Marc Rich. In his twenties, Doronin also worked in Hong Kong trading commodities in the late 80s and early 90s.

Capital Group 

In 1993, Doronin co-founded Capital Group, which entered the Moscow commercial real estate market with class A offices and retail projects, and later expanded with other premium residential developments. Doronin's equal partners in Capital Group from the early 90-ies were Pavel Tio and Eduard Berman. Capital Group has built up its portfolio to include 71 high-end residential and commercial projects with a total of 7 million square meters of space.

In 2009 Doronin’s Capital Group built the City of Capitals mixed-use (office and residential) complex in Moscow City, which consisted of two highrise towers and until 2011 was the highest building in Russia. The complex was designed by Erick van Egeraat.

In 2011 Capital Group built the award-winning Legend of Tsvetnoy residential, office and retail complex in Moscow. The complex was designed by NBBJ.

In 2013 Doronin’s Capital Group formed a joint venture with Gavriil Yushvaev, a Russian entrepreneur, for the construction of OKO — a mixed-use (commercial and residential) highrise development in the Moscow International Business Center. In 2016 55,000 sq.m. of office space in the OKO development was sold to the Government of Moscow.

In his February 2016 interview to the Forbes magazine Doronin explained that Capital Group is jointly managed by the three partners who take strategic decisions together. The operational responsibilities are divided with Doronin responsible for asset sales and acquisitions, attracting investors, development of architectural concepts and marketing, Pavel Tio in charge of relations with the Moscow construction complex, new project and legal work and Berman focusing on fit-out and construction work in Capital Group projects.

Aman Resorts 

Doronin led a group of investors to buy out luxury hospitality company Aman Resorts in 2014. In doing so, Doronin became involved in an ownership dispute with Omar Amanat and Aman's founder, Adrian Zecha. Amanat had partnered with both Zecha and Doronin to buy Aman, and had been expected to contribute $10 million for a jointly-funded deposit. In early January, Doronin received a financial statement showing the money was from Zecha instead. The partnership then fell apart: in April, Zecha announced his resignation as CEO and chairman ahead of a scheduled end-of-July departure, and Doronin took over as CEO. A week later, Zecha was locked out of his office and was also removed from his Aman-owned home, after which he and Amanat claimed ownership of the company. By July, the dispute had escalated into legal matters, with a London High Court temporarily reinstating Zecha, and Doronin suing Amanat in New York City and alleging fraud.

Doronin partnered with Michael Shvo in 2015 to buy floors 4 through 24 of the New York Crown Building in New York for about $500 million as an Aman development project. Following the purchase he redeveloped the building to include 83 hotel rooms and 22 apartments within the tower, Infrastructural facilities, a three-story 2,000 square metre spa, a jazz club, a cigar bar and restaurants.

In March 2016, the High Court in London confirmed a settlement reached between Doronin and the liquidators of an Amanat-founded company, recognizing Doronin's full acquisition of Aman Resorts. Amanat was later convicted in 2017 by the federal court of wire fraud and conspiracy and sentenced to five years in prison. 

In early 2021, Doronin announced the opening of the Aman groups Crown Building hotel and condo complex, Aman New York, which opened to the public in August 2022. It was reported that a nightly cost of a base-level suite starts at $3,200 or a $200,000 admission fee. The building is reported to have 22 permanent residences.

In January 2022, Doronin announced Aman’s latest contract with Italy’s T.Mariotti shipyard to build a luxury yacht and cruise ship, Aman named the plans “project Sama”. The project is a joint venture between Aman and Cruise Saudi and plans to see 600 feet long and 23,000-ton luxury yacht to be created to host around 100 guests.

In August 2022, Doronin announced that the Aman Group has released a collection of leather goods as part of the Aman Essentials line, this line included passport cases, bags and wallets. The collection ranges from $250 to $4,000. CEO of Aman Essentials Kristina Romanova worked on the designs of the collection.

In January 2023 Charles McGonigal, global director of security for Aman Group, was arrested on charges of money laundering and violating US sanctions law. According to the US Department of Justice, McGonigal conspired with a former Russian diplomat to assist Oleg Deripaska, a sanctioned Russian oligarch. McGonigal’s hiring in the spring of 2022 was done through a very obscure process, according to Aman staffers, and raised many eyebrows because the previous director of corporate security was reassigned for no apparent reasons and because when reports that McGonigal was under investigation had surfaced and the first witnesses were scheduled to appear before the grand jury investigation of his conduct, he continued to be retained by the company.

OKO Group 

Doronin's real estate development company OKO Group announced in March 2016 a luxury residential development of a 649-foot, 57-story tower, Missoni Baia, in collaboration with Italian fashion house Missoni.

In 2020, with Doronin as chairman and CEO, OKO Group had partnered with Cain International and began construction on a 57-story office tower at 830 Brickell, Miami, the first office skyscraper built there in over a decade. A second partnership between OKO Group and Cain International in Miami took place with the development of a 47-story residential tower called Una on the Brickell Waterfront.

Under Doronin, in March 2022 OKO bought nearly one acre of land on Aspen Mountain’s underdeveloped west side for 76 million dollars from Norway Island LLC, a business entity comprising Jim DeFrancia, Bryan Peterson and Jeff Gorsuch, a former U.S. ski team downhill racer, a proprietor of a small chain of high-end retail ski shops, and cousin of Supreme Court Associate Justice Neil Gorsuch. The deal generated much controversy in Aspen because eight months earlier, Gorsuch and his partners bought the plot from the Aspen Skiing Company for 10 million dollars. According to Doronin, he has a long-term plan, which involves building a luxury hotel property on the site.

In 2022 OKO Group and Cain International bought bought the Edgewater House and The Ambassador Palm Beach Hotel & Residences in Palm Beach for $147 million.  Doronin and Cain acquired a $105 Million loan from MSD Partners, known as Michael Dell’s investment firm. The Purchase of the property highlights the latest partnership between Doronin’s OKO group and Cain since their joint venture in developing 830 Brickell in 2020.

In 2022, Doronin announced the OKO group had secured a $97 million construction loan for a new development project in downtown Fort Lauderdale. The property, a 34-story tower is set to have 251 units and 2,600 square feet. OKO Group announced the project is to be design by architect Adrian Smith and Gordon Gill, who have previously worked on projects such as the Central Park Tower in Manhattan and the Jeddah Tower in Saudi Arabia.

Janu
In March 2020, with Doronin as CEO Aman launched the sister brand of Aman, Janu. Janu is aimed to be the inverse of Aman’s locations, with an energetic atmosphere. Doronin announced in March 2020 that the Janu brand will launch three hotels that are under construction in Montenegro, Saudi Arabia and Tokyo. The first scheduled launch is aimed to be the Tokyo location in 2023.

Other ventures 

Doronin owned the publishing rights in Germany and Russia to Interview magazine, the style magazine founded by Andy Warhol.

Legal issues 
In March 2019 Nader Tavakoli, an investment banker, filed a lawsuit against Doronin related to the $250 million acquisition of Aman Resorts. Tavakoli claimed that he brokered the acquisition and was promised a carried interest, but was intentionally cut out of the venture by Doronin and his business partner Carl Johan Eliasch. After Doronin’s motion to dismiss the case for lack of personal jurisdiction was defeated, the case was quickly resolved out of court.

In October 2021 the High Court of Justice of the Balearic Islands had dismissed the appeal from Doronin against the 2019 ruling, which ordered him to demolish the works carried out illegally in 2014 at his mansion in a forested area on protected rustic land in Ibiza. The illegal construction was located in Platges de Comte by the Nature Protection Service of Spain's Civil Guard in 2014 but the case dragged on for several years. The High Court's ruling ordered Doronin to pay a fine of 1 million euros to Sant Josep City Council and triggered another legal case evaluating the seriousness of the urban infraction committed by Doronin. It was decided that illegal works are to be demolished by Doronin and, if he fails to do so, by the Sant Josep Town Hall.

In March 2022 Doronin sued Korangy Publishing, the publisher of The Real Deal magazine, for $20 million, claiming that a February 27, 2022 article published on the website, falsely stated that Doronin and Aman Resorts support the Putin regime and the invasion of Ukraine and that Doronin is a Russian citizen and that such statements, repeated in articles on March 1 and 2, 2022, demonstrated a ‘targeted campaign of harassment’ against Doronin. Korangy Publishing responded by retroactively redacting the content of its online articles about Doronin and in July 2022, Doronin discontinued his lawsuit.

In April 2022 Doronin filed a defamation lawsuit Swift Communications, a holding company, which owns The Aspen Times after the newspaper published opinion pieces and a letter to the editor, which implied that Doronin was using his Aspen investment to launder tainted money from Russia. Doronin asked for punitive damages to be imposed on Swift Communications, claiming that ‘The Aspen Times’ ‘...has chosen to … sensationalize a false narrative that targets Mr. Doronin simply because he was born in what is today Russia…’. According to Doronin’s court filings, he earned his wealth legitimately and could not be considered a Russian oligarch, because ‘...oligarchs are not merely wealthy individuals of Russian origin; they are individuals who have amassed their wealth through the exploitation of Russian natural resources, corrupt direction of Russian state-owned enterprises, and close political affiliation with Vladimir Putin.” This description, the suit argued, does not fit Doronin. During the pendency of the suit, coverage of Doronin was suspended by the publisher. Tension over the matter resulted in firing of the editor, Andrew Travers. The legal action was settled by confidential agreement and dismissed on May 27, 2022.

In March 2022 the Moscow Arbitration Court ordered OOO Ballini, a real estate management firm founded by Doronin, into bankruptcy procedures.

Controversy

Business in Russia 
Despite Doronin’s assertions that he had not conducted business in Russia since 2013 or 2014, court filings in the Southern District of Florida, where a Russian LLC ‘Terra Invest’ sought discovery from Doronin over a fraud, ostensibly committed against it in Moscow, show that he held a 33% stake in ‘Capital Group Development’, a Russian LLC formed in 2014 until April 2022 from which he received millions of dollars of dividends annually. Documents also showed that Doronin transferred the ownership in the company to his elderly mother on April 14, one day after he filed his lawsuit against The Aspen Times parent Swift Communications, claiming that the newspaper had defamed him by suggesting that he has ties to Russia. 

In 2022 Doronin’s spokesperson stated that the businessman no longer owns the Zaha Hadid-designed Capital Hill Residence outside of Moscow, however, journalistic investigations revealed that the ownership of the property was transferred to his 87-year old mother Zinaida Doronina.

Doronin's connection to the FIS president 
An report by The Aspen Times revealed that Johan Eliasch, president of International Ski and Snowboard Federation (FIS) was an investor in Aman Resorts since 2014, loaning the company 25 million dollars and investing another 25 million. In 2014-18 Eliasch served as chair of Aman’s board of directors and held a 14% stake in the company. A 2014 article by Fortune magazine cited Amar Amanat, who claimed that Doronin and Eliasch, being friends, orchestrated a corporate coup against him. FIS chose Aspen for the Men’s World Cup skiing races in May 2022, 2 months after Doronin’s acquisition of a prime land lot in Aspen and 8 months after the election of Eliasch as president of FIS.

Art collection 
Doronin collects not only artworks by avant-garde artists (Kazimir Malevich and El Lissitzky), but also by contemporary artists such as Jean-Michel Basquiat, Anish Kapoor, Ed Ruscha, Richard Prince, Urs Fisher, Frank Stella, Julian Schnabel. In 2009 he started the Capital Group Art Foundation, a foundation to support artists.

Doronin has close ties among the art community: artists, gallerists and dealers. He has become friends with some of them. Doronin’s friends includes Tony Shafrazi, a New York gallery owner and dealer, who taught him about contemporary art and the late actor and photographer Dennis Hopper.

Personal life
Doronin was in a relationship with English supermodel Naomi Campbell from 2008 until 2013. He has been in a relationship with Kristina Romanova since 2015.

Doronin has a home in Miami, Florida, and owns an apartment in One Hyde Park.

Born in the Soviet Union, he renounced his Soviet citizenship in 1986. He has since become a Swedish citizen. He is also a resident of Switzerland.

In a 2016 interview with Forbes, Doronin said that he frequently travels to Moscow where he owns a business and to visit friends. In 2018 Doronin finished building Capital Hill Residence, his private residence in Barvikha, a prestigious neighborhood outside of Moscow. The property, designed by Zaha Hadid, has 3,300 sq.m. of space and includes a swimming pool, spa and a library and was estimated to have a market value of $140m. The land lot and the property itself are registered in the name of Doronin’s mother, Zinaida.

Doronin is a friend of Leonardo DiCaprio. In November 2010 Doronin and his then partner Naomi Campbell were among the organizers of Help the Tiger charity event, which took place at the Mikhailovsky Theatre in St. Petersburg and which was attended by DiCaprio and Vladimir Putin.

For many years Doronin has been regularly practicing Qigong, including breathing techniques and fighting methods, and has demonstrated his abilities by demolishing slabs of marble with his head and breaking metal-tipped wooden spears against his throat. According to Doronin, the practice of Qigong is not only limited to martial aspects but allows to heal people from various diseases, including cancer.

Awards and recognition 
For his contributions to the Russian Orthodox Church Doronin has been decorated by Patriarch Alexy II, Patriarch of Moscow and all Rus, the primate of the Russian Orthodox Church.

In 2010 Doronin won "Businessman of the Year" award in Russia. The award ceremony took place on February 25, 2010 in the Moscow Kremlin.

In August 2016, Doronin was included in Surface Magazine’s Power 100 list of prominent individuals, including 15 in real estate and hospitality.

According to Building.ru, Doronin is one of the top ten most professional developers in Russia. His OKO Tower in central Moscow is 1,160 feet high, making it Europe’s tallest completed skyscraper. Doronin was acknowledged as the head of the list of “Top 1000 Russian Managers Rating 2011,” in the category of Development. Doronin was named one of the “Kings of Russian Real Estate” by Forbes in 2014.

In 2015, the New York Post recognized Doronin on their list of "The 20 biggest power players in New York City real estate." In June 2022, he was recognized as one of the 100 Most Powerful People in Global Hospitality by the International Hospitality Institute's  Global 100.

References

External links

 Vladislav Doronin's Personal Website

Russian billionaires
1962 births
Living people
Russian chief executives
Russian businesspeople in real estate
Real estate and property developers
Businesspeople from Saint Petersburg
Real estate company founders
Chief executive officers in the real estate industry
Russian businesspeople in the United Kingdom
Moscow State University alumni
Russian activists against the 2022 Russian invasion of Ukraine